Mehtab Abbasi (born 13 January 1953) is a Pakistani politician from Abbottabad who began his political career as an independent candidate in the 1985 election. He won seats in both the provincial and national assembly. He also won all subsequent elections up to that of 2013.

Sardar Mehtab served as Governor of Khyber Pakhtunkhwa, Pakistan from 2014 to 2016, Chief Minister of Khyber Pakhtunkhwa from 1997 to 1999, and Federal Minister for Railways in 2008. He is politically affiliated with the Pakistan Muslim League (N). He served as a senator for five years beginning in March 2003, until he won the NA-17 Abbottabad-I seat for the National Assembly of Pakistan in the 2008 general election.

Provincial Minister for Law
Sardar Mehtab was elected to a provincial seat after winning the 1986 general election. He served as Provincial Minister for Law and Political Affairs from 1986 until 1988, when another general election was called.

Federal Minister for Kashmir Affairs and Northern Areas (1990–1993)
In 1990, Sardar Mehtab was elected to the National Assembly, for which he abandoned his provincial seat. He was subsequently appointed Federal Minister for Kashmir Affairs and Northern Areas. He held the post until 1993 when the General Assembly was dissolved and new elections were called.

As Chief Minister (1997–1999)
Abbasi became the 16th Chief Minister of Khyber Pakhtunkhwa on 21 February 1997, taking over from Raja Sikander Zaman; he served until 12 October 1999.

During his tenure as Chief Minister, Abbasi approved the Chief Minister Development Plan prepared by Professor Subhan Qureshi, which was later updated to Dairy Science Park through two international workshops held at the University of Agriculture, Peshawar in 2011 and 2013 respectively. The Park has given birth to the Peshawar Meat Company, which is to be implemented jointly by the University of Agriculture, Peshawar, the Department of Local Government and Rural Development, the Khyber Pakhtunkhwa Chamber of Commerce and Industry, the Small and Medium Enterprises Development Authority, and the Khyber Pakhtunkhwa Board of Investment and Trade.

Post-CM political career
Abbasi could not contest the general elections in 2002 for the National Assembly and had to settle for being a senator from March 2003 – March 2008.

As Senator (2003–2008)
Abbasi was among the few politicians who remained in Pakistan. He was an integral part of the party during the exile of Nawaz Sharif and was elected to the Senate of Pakistan in 2003 holding this office until the 2008 general elections.

Member of National Assembly (2008–2013)
In the 2008 general elections, Mehtab Ahmed Khan won the NA-17 Abbottabad seat. He also won the PF-45 provincial assembly seat and had to vacate both the Senate and the Provincial Assembly seats after the victory since a parliamentarian in Pakistan can only keep one seat. His son Shamoon Yar Khan won this seat. He was elected as the federal Minister for Railways on 31 March 2008 in the initial coalition between the PPP and PML(N) after the elections. However, he, along with the other PML(N) ministers, resigned less than two months later after differences regarding the restoration of the judges who were removed during the 2007 Pakistani state of emergency.
In the 2013 general elections, Mehtab Ahmad Khan lost to his political rival for a seat in the national assembly.

Post 2013 Elections
Abbasi was elected as the Opposition Leader in the Provincial Assembly of Khyber Pakhtunkhwa on 3 June 2013; he retained the position until 9 April 2014 when he resigned to take the oath as the governor of Khyber Pakhtunkhwa.

Governor of Khyber Pakhtunkhwa
The President of Pakistan, Mamnoon Hussain, on the advice of then Prime Minister, Nawaz Sharif, appointed Abbasi as Governor of Khyber Pakhtunkhwa. Abbasi took the oath of the office  on 15 April 2014 in Peshawar.
On 8 February 2016, Abbasi resigned as Governor of Khyber Pakhtunkhwa.

Head Of Aviation Affairs
After resigning as the Governor of Khyber Pakhtunkhwa and a year-long hiatus, Abbasi took up the role of aviation advisor to the prime minister on 14 February 2017. Abbasi took this position to improve the loss-making Pakistan International Airlines (PIA) and turnaround its operations. In this short time, he has made big changes in the PIA, whereby the CEO and CCO were replaced. Furthermore, improvements have been made in aircraft surveillance to curb drug trafficking, which was rampant in the past. The New Islamabad Airport was also completed under his supervision.

References

External links
Minister of Railways Profile
Profile on Senator Mehtab Ahmed Khan
Politicians of Pakistan
Sardar Mehtab as MNA
A Pakistani Leader
Political History of Circle Bakote
Sardar Mehtab tribe of Circle Bakote 

|-

1952 births
Living people
Hindkowan people
North-West Frontier Province MPAs 1997–1999
Pakistan Muslim League (N) politicians
People from Abbottabad District
Minister of Railways (Pakistan)